Valdost is the rural locality (a village) in Tikhvinsky District of Leningrad Oblast, Russia, located on Lake Bolshaya Valdost at a height of  above sea level.

References

Rural localities in Leningrad Oblast